The Delage 12 CEDirs was a French racing aero-engine designed and built especially to power the Kellner-Béchereau 28VD for racing in the 1933 Coupe Deutsch de la Meurthe air races.

Design and development
The 12 CEDirs was an inverted 60° V-12 water-cooled engine with reduction gearing and two Roots blower superchargers.

Operational history
The 12 CEDirs was flown for the first time, in the 28VD, on 12 May 1933. Problems with propeller speed dogged the initial flights and are blamed for the crash of the 28VD on 14 May 1933. The propeller was over-speeding to a high degree, causing a cooling system rupture. With steam obscuring his view the pilot force-landed the 28 VD with nil visibility, destroying the aircraft but not causing serious injury to the pilot.

Applications
 Kellner-Béchereau 28VD

Specifications (12 CEDirs)

References

1930s aircraft piston engines